is a railway station on the Hokuriku Railroad Ishikawa Line in the city of Kanazawa, Ishikawa Prefecture Japan, operated by the private railway operator Hokuriku Railroad (Hokutetsu).

Lines
The station is located in front of Nishi-Kanazawa Station on the Hokuriku Main Line of JR West.

Station layout
The station consists of one island platform serving two tracks, connected to the station building by a level crossing.

Adjacent stations

History
It was renamed to its present name on 10 February 1926.

Surrounding area
 Kenmin Sport Recreation Plaza Kanazawa (ice skating rink)

See also
 List of railway stations in Japan

References

External links

  

Railway stations in Ishikawa Prefecture
Railway stations in Japan opened in 1915
Hokuriku Railroad Ishikawa Line